Thiel may refer to:

 Thiel (surname), including a list of people with the name
 Thiel (crater), lunar crater named for Walter Thiel
 Thiel Audio, a loudspeaker manufacturer
 Thiel College in Pennsylvania
 Thiel Detective Service Company, a private detective agency
 Thiel Fellowship, a fellowship through the Thiel Foundation for students under the age of 23
 Thiel Foundation, a private foundation
 Thiel Mountains of Antarctica
 Thiel Trough, geographical feature

See also
 Thiel-sur-Acolin, commune in France
 Thiel–Behnke dystrophy, a rare form of corneal dystrophy
 Teal (disambiguation), pronounced like "Thiel"